Biały is Polish for "white". The word is a Polish surname, as well as a nickname of several Polish monarchs and noblemen. It may refer to:

 Leszek Biały (c. 1186–1227),  High Duke of Poland 
Henryk Biały (13th century), Duke of Wroclaw
Władysław Biały (14th century), Duke of Gniewkowo
Konrad Biały
Konrad VII the White (1396-1452)
Konrad X the White (1420-1492)
 Biały, a codename for Bolesław Kontrym, Polish Army World War II officer
Harvey Bialy (born 1945), American molecular biologist
Leszek Włodzimierz Biały (born 1954), Polish writer, translator and diplomat
Bialy (bread)

Polish-language surnames